Hendrik Meijer may refer to:
 Hendrik Meijer (1883–1964), Dutch-American businessman who founded US supermarket chain, Meijer
 Henk Meijer (born 1959), Dutch taekwondo coach and former competitor
 Hendrik de Meijer (1744-1793), painter from the Northern Netherlands
 Hank Meijer (born 1952), co-chairman and CEO, Meijer, grandson of Hendrik